Jefferson Moffitt (December 17, 1887 – April 8, 1954) was an American screenwriter and film director.  He wrote for more than 80 films between 1923 and 1953. He was born in Oakland, California, and died in Los Angeles, California.

Partial filmography

 The Oregon Trail (1923)
 The Eagle's Talons (1923)
 In the Days of Daniel Boone (1923)
 The Other Kind of Love (1924)
 The Cowboy and the Flapper (1924)
 The Martyr Sex (1924)
 Battling Bunyan (1924)
 Butter Fingers (1925)
 Mulhall's Greatest Catch (1926)
 Legionnaires in Paris (1927)
 Crazy to Act (1927)
 The Good-Bye Kiss (1928)
 The Campus Vamp (1928)
 Bonnie Scotland (1935)
 Kelly the Second (1936)
 Always in Trouble (1938)

External links

1887 births
1954 deaths
American male screenwriters
American film directors
20th-century American male writers
20th-century American screenwriters